"Whatever You Say" is a song written by Ed Hill and Tony Martin and recorded by American country music artist Martina McBride. It was released in February 1999 as the fifth and final single from McBride’s album Evolution. The song peaked at number 2 on the US Billboard Hot Country Songs and at number 37 on the Billboard Hot 100. It also peaked at number 6 on the Canadian RPM chart.

Background
"Whatever You Say" is a slow contemporary-styled ballad, which was the theme of McBride's album that this song was released on.

Content
The song discusses how a woman finds herself in a confusing relationship with a man. The female character argues how her lover believes that she is always making a big deal out of nothing important. She believes that whatever her lover says depends on whether or not she stays in the relationship. Sara Evans and Neil Thrasher sing backing vocals.

Chart performance
"Whatever You Say" was issued as the fifth and final single from Martina McBride's fourth album, Evolution, which was a multi-platinum success. The song was released as a single to country radio in early 1999, peaking at number 2 on the Hot Country Songs chart and number 37 on the Billboard Hot 100, becoming one of two singles spawned from the album that reached number 2 ("Happy Girl" was the first). The song also reached a peak of number 6 on the Canadian RPM chart that same year, becoming her sixth Top 10 on that chart.

Year-end charts

Parodies
 American country music parody artist Cledus T. Judd released a parody of "Whatever You Say" titled "What the *$@# Did You Say".

References

1999 singles
1997 songs
Martina McBride songs
Music videos directed by Deaton-Flanigen Productions
Songs written by Tony Martin (songwriter)
Song recordings produced by Paul Worley
RCA Records Nashville singles
Songs written by Ed Hill